Clearing Customs is a studio album by English guitarist, composer and improvisor Fred Frith. It is based on a week of recordings and performances in November and December 2007 at a New Jazz Meeting at SWR, a radio station in southwest Germany. Two hour-long national broadcasts were made. The album was released by Intakt Records in February 2011.

The music is based on a 75-minute composition by Frith, and improvised by all the performers. It uses a "graphic structural model" that links "diverse types of musical events" on a time line. Traditional jazz instruments were used, plus Asian guzheng and tablas, and electronics. Frith drew on English theatre maker Peter Brook's approach of bringing together performers from completely different cultural backgrounds.

According to Frith, a key aspect of the music is the fact that the performers were meeting for the first time. He reflected: "The expression 'clearing customs' had multiple meanings for me – 'crossing borders', of course, but also 'getting rid of old habits', and also 'the things you do when you have space around you'. It was playful and deep at the same time, and those musicians were and are amazing."

Reception

In a review for All About Jazz, Nic Jones wrote: "An unusual instrumentation enhances the singularity of the single hour-long title piece, and the deployment is something else... Frith has always maintained an interest in longer forms, despite the brevity shown by much of his music on record. Clearing Customs summarizes this interest, but for him—and indeed his fellow performers on this record—the journey continues."

Writing for Point of Departure, Art Lange commented: "As the musicians co-inhabit segments of time they create a cross-talk of rhythms and styles; brief echoes of Japanese, Chinese, and Korean court musics and lyrical folk songs emerge and recede, with the ensemble thickening and thinning out to sustain momentum. There are moments of tension, of tranquility, of aridity. But the strongest impression that the music makes, and the clue that Frith has succeeded at his goal, is that this sounds not like the result of a single vision, but rather of a true ensemble – a cohesive community of effort."

The New York City Jazz Record's Marc Medwin stated: "Despite numerous layers, there is never a sense of clutter, as there is with so many pieces where samples and live instruments coexist. The album's title is apt. As... diatonic music returns to end the work, there is a sense of circularity, but the road traveled has also been winding; there is a feeling that the slate has been wiped clean, all customs cleared and a new music created."

Track listing
All tracks composed by Fred Frith.

"Clearing Customs" – 67:50

Source: Discogs

Personnel
Fred Frith – guitar, home-made instruments
Wu Fei – guzheng
Anantha Krishnan – mridangam, tablas
Marque Gilmore – drums, electronics
Tilman Müller – trumpet
Patrice Scanlon – electronics
Daniela Cattivelli – electronics

Source: Intakt Records

Sound and artwork
Recorded at SWR studio 1 in Baden-Baden, Germany on November 29, 2007, and in Saarbrücken, Germany on December 1, 2007.
Wolfgang Bachner – recording engineer
Alfred Habelitz – sound engineer
Fred Frith – mixing, liner notes
Manfred Seiler – mixing
Manfred Seiler – mastering
Reinhard Kager – liner notes
Heike Liss – cover art
Jonas Schoder – graphic design

Source: Intakt Records

References

External links
Clearing Customs at Intakt Records
Clearing Customs reviews at Intakt Records

2011 albums
Intakt Records albums
Fred Frith albums